John E. "Jack" Sherry was a two sport star at Pennsylvania State University (Penn State). In American football, he set a team record with 8 interceptions in 1952. In basketball, he was team captain of Penn State's team that reached the 1954 Final Four.

In 1952, Sherry intercepted 8 passes, returned for 101 yards. In 1954, he led Penn State in receiving yards and tied for the team lead in receptions (11 catches for 160 yards, 14.5 average, 1 touchdown).

In the 1954 NCAA Men's Division I Basketball Tournament, Penn State defeated Toledo (62-50), LSU (78-70) and Notre Dame (71-63) to make the Final Four. They were defeated by La Salle (69-54) but defeated USC (70-61) for third place.

Sherry is a member of the West Philadelphia Catholic High School Sports Hall of Fame.

References

External links
 Forty years later: Reliving a magical run
 Nittany Lion Basketball Reunion Weekend Features 50th Anniversary of ’54 Final Four Team
 Nittany Lions' current season reminiscent of 1954 team
 Hickey Endows Scholarship In Teammate's Name

Penn State Nittany Lions football players
Players of American football from Pennsylvania
Living people
Penn State Nittany Lions basketball players
Place of birth missing (living people)
Year of birth missing (living people)
American men's basketball players